Gina Dirawi (born 11 December 1990) is a Swedish television presenter, singer-songwriter, radio personality, blogger, comedian and actress. While she is best known as the first woman ever to host Melodifestivalen on three occasions, she has also hosted several other television and radio shows. She has also released music and played the lead role in the play "Donna Juanita" on Stadsteatern in Stockholm.

Personal life
Dirawi was born on 11 December 1990 in Sundsvall, Sweden, the second of four children. She is of Palestinian descent and her family comes from Lebanon. Dirawi's paternal grandparents convinced her father to move to Sweden. After eventually moving to Sundsvall to study, he returned to Lebanon to marry Dirawi's mother. Her parents settled in Sundsvall, as did her paternal grandparents who moved to the city a couple of years later. Her grandfather was an imam in Sundsvall until his death in March 2011.

Career
Dirawi began her career in March 2009, with her blog Ana Gina, and by August of the same year began vlogging.

Her vlog included satirical depictions of recurring characters from Swedish and Palestinian culture. She continued to gain popularity by sharing videos on YouTube, where her videos have over 18 million views as of May 2016.

Dirawi is best known as the first woman ever to host Melodifestivalen on three occasions: in 2012 alongside Helena Bergström and Sarah Dawn Finer, in 2013 alongside Danny Saucedo and in 2016 with guest co-hosts in each show.

She won the award for best female TV host at the Kristallen in 2012 and 2013.

Dirawi also hosted the Swedish Grammy Awards in 2014 and 2015, as well as Musikhjälpen in 2011, 2012 and 2015, the same year she hosted SVT's traditional Christmas Eve programme.

It was announced on 20 April 2016 that Dirawi will be the Swedish spokesperson at the annual Eurovision Song Contest, announcing the results of the Swedish jury vote from Eurovision: The Party in the Tele2 Arena in Stockholm. She also hosted Studio Eurovision, a series of three one-hour shows broadcast before the two semi-finals and the final, covering news and events from the contest.

She co-hosted Idol 2017 along with Pär Lernström, she also hosted it in 2018.

In 2019, SVT released the documentary "What Happened to Gina Dirawi" by Jane Magnusson. A story about how Gina Dirawi had to live with security and protection during her time as the biggest tv-host in Sweden, due to severe death-threats from nazi-groups.
2020 and 2021 she hosted the alternative Nobel prize, "Right livelihood award". 2022 she hosted Swedish equivalent to the Oscars, Guldbaggegalan.

In 2020, she realised her first novel "Paradiset ligger under mammas fötter", pubilished with Norstedts. In 2022,  she released her first studio album "Meet Me In Jannah", produced by Björn Yttling and Freja Drakenberg.

Discography

Albums

Singles

References

External links 

1990 births
Living people
People from Sundsvall
Swedish people of Palestinian descent
21st-century Swedish comedians
Swedish women comedians
Swedish television hosts
Swedish women television presenters
Swedish bloggers
Swedish women bloggers
Swedish radio presenters
Swedish women radio presenters